Antisemitism in Russia is expressed in acts of hostility against Jews in Russia and the promotion of antisemitic views in the Russian Federation. This article covers the events since the dissolution of the Soviet Union. Previous time periods are covered in the articles Antisemitism in the Russian Empire and Antisemitism in the Soviet Union.

Since the early 2000s, levels of antisemitism in Russia have been low, and steadily decreasing. The President of the Russian Jewish Congress attributes this in part to the vanished state sponsorship of antisemitism. At the same time experts warn that worsening economic conditions may lead to the surge of xenophobia and antisemitism in particular.

History
During the 1990s antisemitism was an enduring undercurrent and source of anxiety, its presence affirmed by easily accessible antisemitic newspapers and other publications, street or popular antisemitism. The number of antisemitic incidents rose sharply after the 1998 Russian financial crisis, the devaluation of the ruble, and the ensuing economic hardships affecting a broad segment of the general population.

High-profile antisemitic voices have included several Russian Communist public figures such as Nikolai Kondratenko, a former governor of Krasnodar Krai. He claimed the Kremlin was controlled by Jews and Zionists, to blame for the demise of the Communist Party, the Chechen conflict and other problems. He formed an alliance with local Cossacks and was said to believe that an international Jewish conspiracy rules the world. Other high-profile figures have included deputies of the State Duma from the CPRF such as Albert Makashov and Viktor Ilyukhin. In November 1998 the State Duma considered and rejected a measure to denounce Makashov. In late December 1998 Gennady Zyuganov, leader of the Russian Communist Party, was under pressure to publicly censure the bigoted statements of his comrades and did indeed denounce antisemitism, but at the same time labeled Zionism "a blood relative of fascism".

The ideology of Russian neo-Nazism is closely connected with the ideology of Slavic neopaganism (Rodnoverie). In a number of cases, there are also organizational ties between neo-Nazis and neopagans. One of the founders of Russian neo-paganism, the former Soviet dissident Alexey Dobrovolsky (pagan name - Dobroslav) shared the ideas of neo-Nazism and transferred them to his neopagan teaching. According to the historian Roman Shizhensky, Dobrovolsky took the idea of the swastika from the work of the Nazi ideologist Herman Wirth (the first head of the Ahnenerbe).

The eight-beam "kolovrat", consisting of two swastikas superimposed on each other, is considered in Slavic neopaganism to be the ancient Slavic sign of the Sun. In 1996, Dobrovolsky declared it a symbol of an uncompromising "national liberation struggle" against the "Zhyd yoke". According to Dobrovolsky, the meaning of the "kolovrat" completely coincides with the meaning of the Nazi swastika.

Since the mid-2000s incorporation of antisemitic discourse into the platforms and speeches of nationalist political movements in Russia has been reported by human rights monitors in Russia as well as in the press. Antisemitic slogans and rhetoric in public demonstrations are frequently reported, most of them attributed to nationalist parties and political groups such as "Rusoslav Orthodox". Former member of the Duma Vladimir Zhirinovsky was known for antisemitic speeches.

In 2001, 98 United States Senators penned a letter to President Putin, expressing concern about popular antisemitism, radical extremists (such as former Klansman and Grand Wizard David Duke) in the Russian Federation.

In January 2005 a group of twenty members of the Duma published a statement accusing Jews of being anti-Christian, inhumane, committing ritual murder and that "the entire democratic world today is under the financial and political control of international Jewry".

On June 9, 2005, Russian Orthodox Patriarch Alexei II addressed the international conference of the Organization for Security and Co-operation in Europe in Cordoba, Spain, to declare that the Russian Orthodox Church shares concerns over "incidents of antisemitism, xenophobia and other forms of racism". He described antisemitism, as "one of the more radical expression of misanthropy and racism", and said its perpetrators included “public figures, publicists, and the leaders of radical organizations".

For example, the February 23, 2006 rally celebrating “Defenders of the Fatherland Day”, a yearly tribute to war veterans, according to the newspaper Kommersant, marchers flourished signs with messages including "Zhids! Stop drinking Russian blood!", “White State!", and "Russian Government for Russia".

In May 2014, Russian President Vladimir Putin signed a law that made it illegal to deny holocaust and denial of Nazi crimes. It also made portrayal of Nazis as heroes a criminal offence.

In 2019, Ilya Yablogov wrote that many Russians were keen on antisemitic conspiracy theories in 1990s but it declined after 2000 and many high-ranking officials were forced to apologize for the antisemitic behavior.

The 2019 Pew Research poll found that 18% of Russians held unfavorable views of Jews, the number has dropped from 34% in 2009.

During the onset of Russian-Ukraine war, some Russian officials were accused of using antisemitism in their hostile rhetoric towards Ukraine.

Gallery

See also
History of the Jews in Russia
Israel–Russia relations
Anti-Jewish pogroms in the Russian Empire
Racism in Russia

References

Sources
 
 
 

 
Racism in Russia
Russia